Losnegard is a very small village in the municipality of Solund in Vestland county, Norway. Losnegard is the only settlement on the island of Losna. There is ferry service from Losnegard to Krakhella (on the nearby island of Sula) and to Rutledal on the mainland in Gulen. The population of Losnegard (2001) was 4.

References

Villages in Vestland
Solund